A referendum on minority rights was held in Slovenia on 4 April 2004. Voters were asked whether they approved government proposals to restore basic rights to ethnic minorities who had been erased from the citizen registry in 1992. The proposal was rejected by 96.05% of voters, with a turnout of 31.55%.

The referendum was backed by oppositional Slovenian Democratic Party, while the government called for a boycott.

Results

References

2004 referendums
2004 in Slovenia
Minority rights
2004
April 2004 events in Europe